The Galle Literary Festival is an international literary festival held annually in Galle, Sri Lanka. In recent years the profile of the festival has increased substantially, with attendances by many internationally acclaimed and well-known writers. In 2012 the title sponsor of the festival has been HSBC.

The festival was founded in 2005 by Anglo-Australian hotelier Geoffrey Dobbs, and some of the writers who have attended the festival include D.J. Taylor and Roshi Fernando., Sashi Tharoor, Shyam Selvadurai etc.

However, in 2011 the festival hit a setback when a number respected writers including Kiran Desai and Novel Prize winner Orhan Pamuk boycotted the event to protest against the Sri Lankan Government's alleged involvement in attacks on journalists and writers.,

Further well-known writers and musicians at past festivals include Tom Stoppard, Michael Morpurgo, Madhur Jaffrey, Julian Barnes Richard Dawkins, Simon Sebag Montefiore, David Thompson, and Jason Kouchak

The festival was not held in 2013 because of the ill-health of Geoffrey Dobbs

The festival is now one of the leading literary festivals in Asia, and the 2018 Festival expanded its remit to include art trails, cookery, cabaret, and music.  In spite of the absence of Louis de Bernieres (due to ill health), the events were well attended by an enthusiastic audience.  International authors were well represented by Sebastian Faulks, Alexander McCall Smith and Richard Flanagan.  Poet Sonnet Mondial and novelist Siddharth Dasgupta represented up and coming Indian literature.

Other events included:
A talk from Dame Maggie Smith 
Cabaret from Dillie Keane
Fashion show by Beatrice von Tresckow
Photo exhibition by Chris Dawes
Music from Bangladeshi fusion band Chirkutt

References

External links
Galle Literary Festival
Festival programme

Galle
Festivals in Sri Lanka
Sri Lankan literature
Annual events in Galle